Arachova (also Αράχοβα) is a mountain town and a former municipality in the western part of Boeotia.  Since the 2011 local government reform it is a municipal unit, part of the municipality Distomo-Arachova-Antikyra. It is a tourist destination due to its location in the mountains, its traditions and its proximity to the town of Delphi. The town is a popular day or weekend trip destination  from Attica and a gathering place for the rich and famous.  This is not to be confused with Caryae (also spelled Karye) which is a town in the Southern Peleponnese that used to be called Arachova.

Greek rebels under Georgios Karaiskakis defeated the Ottomans at the 1826 Battle of Arachova.

The Formaela cheese from Arachova has been designated as a protected designation of origin. Nearby Arachova, modern ski facilities are popular with visitors. Although contemporary culture tends to outdo regional folklore, the town maintains some local customs and demonstrates them at celebrations on 23 April, in the honor of the patron Saint George.

Arachova has a panoramic view, uphill small houses and the cobbled streets show a picturesque architecture. The town center includes a huge and steep cliff, the Bell Tower, covered with dense ivy. At the top of the tower is a large 10m height clock. Arachova is famous for its black wine, its "brusque", the colorful textiles, carpets and rugs, handicrafts and woodcut creations as well.

Historical significance

Geography

Arachova is situated at about a 970 m (3182 ft) elevation on the southern slope of Mount Parnassus, above the valley of the river Pleistos. The municipal unit has an area of 139.448 km2. Arachova is located 8 km E of Delphi, 9 km northwest of Distomo, 18 km southeast of Amfissa and 26 km west of Livadeia. The Greek National Road 48 (Naupactus - Delphi - Livadeia) passes through the town. The Parnassos Ski Centre is situated to the north.

Climate
Arachova has a temperate climate. Snow falls in winter, though its sheltered location means that it receives less snow than areas at similar altitudes on the north side of Parnassos mountain. Summers are warm with pleasant nights.

Historical population

Gallery

See also
List of settlements in Boeotia

References

External links

Arachova site

Populated places in Boeotia
Mount Parnassus